The Woman Who Brushed Off Her Tears is a multilingual film directed by Teona Strugar Mitevska and produced by Labina Mitevska, Danijel Hocevar, Marcel Lenz, Sébastien Delloye, Diana Elbaum.

The film premiered during Panorama section of the 2012 Berlin International Film Festival.

Plot 
The storyline of the film revolves around the lives of two women (mothers) — coming from two different social background. The first mother is a Western woman, lives in France after tragic death of her son. The other woman comes from a patriarchal society. She lives with her father Ismail. The first woman has lost interest about life and wants to die, but the second woman is desirous to live.

Cast 
 Victoria Abril as Helena
  Labina Mitevska as Ajsun
 Jean Marie Galey as Emil
 Arben Bajraktaraj as Lucian
 Firdaus Nebi as Ismail
 Dimitar Gjorgjievski as Noah
 Katarina Orlandic

References

External links 
 

2012 films
German drama films
Macedonian drama films
2010s German films